Oxysterol-binding protein-related protein 3 is a protein that in humans is encoded by the OSBPL3 gene.

Function 

This gene encodes a member of the oxysterol-binding protein (OSBP) family, a group of intracellular lipid receptors. Most members contain an N-terminal pleckstrin homology domain and a highly conserved C-terminal OSBP-like sterol-binding domain. Several transcript variants encoding different isoforms have been identified.

Model organisms 

Model organisms have been used in the study of OSBPL3 function. A conditional knockout mouse line called Osbpl3tm1a(EUCOMM)Wtsi was generated at the Wellcome Trust Sanger Institute. Male and female animals underwent a standardized phenotypic screen to determine the effects of deletion. Additional screens performed:  - In-depth immunological phenotyping

References

Further reading